Chantilly Forest or Forest of Chantilly (Forêt de Chantilly) is a forest that spreads across , located mainly in the Oise,  north of Paris.

Forests of France
Geography of Oise
Tourist attractions in Oise
Hauts-de-France region articles needing translation from French Wikipedia